Kaelan Casey (born 28 October 2004) is an English professional footballer who plays as a  defender for West Ham United.

Career
Growing up in Thurrock,
Casey joined West Ham’s football academy when he was five years-old. In the 2020-21 season, Casey made his debut appearances for the under-18s and played for West Ham in the EFL Trophy. By September 2022, Casey was playing regularly at the under-21 level with West Ham. On 31 May, 2022 Casey had signed a professional contract with the club. Casey made his senior debut for West Ham United on 3 November 2022 in the UEFA Europa Conference League against FCSB, appearing as a second half substitute for Ben Johnson, in a 3–0 West Ham win.

Style of play
Casey cites Declan Rice as his role model. His father, Paul, told The Athletic that whilst he has always played as a centre-back he can also contribute in midfield.

Personal life
The child of Paul and Jill Casey, he has a sister called Lois. Kaelan Casey attended Shaw Primary Academy in South Ockendon in the borough of Thurrock in Essex.

References

2004 births
Living people
English footballers
Association football defenders
West Ham United F.C. players
People from Thurrock
People from Brentwood, Essex
Footballers from Essex